Boswellia ogadensis is a species of plant in the Burseraceae family. It is endemic to Ethiopia.

References

Flora of Ethiopia
ogadensis
Vulnerable plants
Taxonomy articles created by Polbot
Taxa named by Kaj Borge Vollesen